Torronsuo National Park is a national park in the Tavastia Proper region of Finland. Even before its declaration as a national park in 1990, the near-natural state swamp area was a protected area.

The park area is a typical ombrotrophic raised bog – a thick turf layer with its middle part raising above its edges.

Torronsuo is valuable for its birdlife and butterfly species. Roughly a hundred species nest in the area. Part of the birds and insects are species that typically live in the northern areas, and they aren't seen much elsewhere in southern Finland.

See also 
 List of national parks of Finland
 Protected areas of Finland

References

External links
 
 Nationalparks.fi – Torronsuo National Park
 Teemu Tahvanainen: When several units make one large bog massif: Torronsuo – Finland’s largest raised bog massif. In: The Finnish Environment 28, 1996. pp. 137–141.

National parks of Finland
Tammela, Finland
Protected areas established in 1990
Geography of Kanta-Häme
Tourist attractions in Kanta-Häme
1990 establishments in Finland
Ramsar sites in Finland